Yaşar Doğu Sport Hall is a multi-purpose indoor arena located in the Tekkeköy district of Samsun Province, Turkey. Named in honor of renowned Turkish sport wrestler Yaşar Doğu (1913–1961), the sports hall was opened end March 2013.

History
The sport hall is situated at Sanayi Mah. in Tekkeköy. The construction began in July 2011 and cost 35 million (approx. US$19.5 million), of which 80% was financed by Youth and Sports General Directoriate in Ankara and the remaining 20% by Samsun Metropolitan Municipality. It has a total seating capacity consisting of 7,500 for spectators, 500 at moving grandstand and 300 for press. The complex houses also four big training halls, two squash halls, six big locker rooms, administrative, medical and social facilities.

The arena's first event hosted was an international Judo tournament organized by the International Judo Federation (IJF). In April and May 2013, music concerts for young people and  a music festival will take place at the venue. An international amateur boxing tournament was scheduled to be realized in June 2013. It will host on July 4–14 2013 FIBA Europe Under-20 Championship for Women Division A events.

Minister of Youth and Sports Suat Kılıç stated that the 1966-built sports hall with the same name in downtown Samsun having 1,700 seating capacity will be abandoned soon.

International events hosted
 2013
 Judo Grand Prix 2013 Samsun, March 30–31,
 FIBA Europe Under-20 Championship for Women 2013 Samsun, July 4–14,

 2015
 WTF World Taekwondo Grand Prix 2015 Samsun, September 18–20,
 WTF World Para-Taekwondo Championships 2015 Samsun, September 15–17,

 2016
 2016 Judo Grand Prix Samsun, April 1–04

 2017
 The venue hosted basketball events of the 2017 Summer Deaflympics along with Bahattin Ekinci Sports Hall located in the same city.

2021
 The 2021 IBSA Goalball European Championships A were played between 1-13 November.

References

Sports venues in Samsun
Indoor arenas in Turkey
Sports venues completed in 2013
Basketball venues in Turkey
Music venues in Turkey
Boxing venues in Turkey
Judo venues
Tekkeköy
2013 establishments in Turkey